Maya Center is a village in the Stann Creek District of Belize. It is located on the road to the Cockscomb Basin Wildlife Sanctuary. According to the 2010 census, Maya Center has a population of 386 people in 87 households.

References 

Populated places in Stann Creek District